Joan of Arc (1412–1431) was a French woman who is known for her role in the Hundred Years' War and as a religious figure.

Joan of Arc may also refer to:

Film and television
 Joan of Arc (1900 film)
 Joan of Arc (1935 film)
 Joan of Arc (1948 film)
 The Messenger: The Story of Joan of Arc (1999 film)
 Joan of Arc (miniseries) (1999 television miniseries)
 Joan of Arc (2019 film)

Music
 Joan of Arc (band), an American indie band
 Joan of Arc (album), by Tony Conrad, 2006
 "Joan of Arc" (Henry Burr song), 1917
 "Joan of Arc" (Leonard Cohen song), 1971
 "Joan of Arc" (Little Mix song), 2018
 "Joan of Arc" (Madonna song), 2015
 "Joan of Arc" (Orchestral Manoeuvres in the Dark song), 1981
 "Joan of Arc", a song by Arcade Fire from Reflektor, 2013
 "Joan of Arc", a song by In This Moment from Ritual, 2017
 "Joan of Arc", a song by the Melvins from Houdini, 1993

Other uses
 Joan of Arc (horse) (foaled 2018), an Irish Thoroughbred racehorse
 Joan of Arc (painting), an 1879 painting by Jules Bastien-Lepage
 Joan of Arc (poem), a 1796 epic poem by Robert Southey
 Joan of Arc: The Image of Female Heroism, a 1981 book by Marina Warner
 Joan of Arc: Siege & the Sword, a 1989 video game

See also
 Cultural depictions of Joan of Arc
 Jeanne d'Arc (disambiguation)
 Order of St. Joan D'Arc Medallion, a U.S. Army award
 Sainte-Jeanne-d'Arc (disambiguation)
 Joan of Arcadia, a 2003–2005 American TV series
 Joan Van Ark (born 1943), American actress